John Hedges may refer to:

 John C. Hedges, American football coach
 John Hedges (English politician, died 1562)
 John Hedges (English politician, died 1737), MP for Mitchell, Fowey and Bossiney
 John Hedges, musician with Carol Lou Trio
 John Hedges (British governor), first acting governor of British East Florida, 20–30 July 1763  
 John Hedges (archaeologist), British archaeologist, editor of British Archaeological Reports

See also
 Hedges (surname)